The third season of Ikki Tousen, titled Ikki Tousen: Great Guardians, is an anime television series based on the manga by Yuji Shiozaki, published by Wani Books and serialized in the seinen manga magazine Comic GUM. A third season, titled , aired 12 episodes on AT-X between June 11 and August 27, 2008, with subsequent broadcasts on Chiba TV, TV Saitama, TV Aichi, TV Kanagawa, Sun Television, and Tokyo MX. Produced by ARMS, the series is directed by Koichi Ohata, series composition by Masanao Akahoshi, music by Yasuharu Takanashi, characters by Rin Shin, and produced by Hisato Usui, Nobusaku Tanaka, Osamu Ecchu, Takuro Hatakeyama, and Yasuhiro Mikami. The series was licensed by Media Blasters, as with the second season, but it is now licensed by Funimation Entertainment after they withdrew the license.


Episode list

Home media

Japanese
Six DVD compilation volumes were released by Media Factory between September 25, 2008 and February 25, 2009, each volume containing an original video animation called . A DVD boxset was released on March 25, 2010.

References

2008 Japanese television seasons
Ikki Tousen